Barbara Robinson (born June 4, 1960) is an American film producer and studio executive who has worked her entire career in greater China. Over the course of three decades, Robinson has collaborated with many of the most prominent directors from China, Hong Kong, and Taiwan — and played a critical role in the production of Ang Lee’s breakthrough martial arts title, Crouching Tiger/Hidden Dragon.

Crouching Tiger/Hidden Dragon set box-office records in the United States and around the world, it is credited as being the first film with subtitles to become an American blockbuster. Film Journal noted that Crouching Tiger/Hidden Dragon "pulled off the rare trifecta of critical acclaim, boffo box-office and gestalt shift."

Her films have received top awards at all the major film festivals (Cannes, Berlin and Venice and Hong Kong) as well as multiple Oscar, Golden Globe and BAFTA award wins.

She has held senior positions with Sony Pictures Entertainment, and most recently with Wanda Media, the film and television production and distribution arm of the Wanda Group as adviser to its Los Angeles operations. Robinson is frequently cited as an expert on how Chinese and American film companies can collaborate.

In 1988, Barbara Robinson pioneered the creation of the first China-based production unit of an American studio when she joined the Columbia Tristar Motion Picture Group (a Sony Pictures Entertainment company) as Managing Director to establish its local-language film production division, Columbia Pictures Film Production Asia, based in Hong Kong.

Under Robinson's leadership, the combination of Sony's expertise and local production partners was remarkably effective, creating films that succeeded at the box office both in China and around the world. In this role, she became the first international production partner for the Huayi Brothers, and developed close working partnerships with China Film, China Co-Production Company, and other important Chinese industry partners and government agencies.

At Sony, she was responsible for Ang Lee’s Crouching Tiger, Hidden Dragon, winner of four Oscars that set records in the United States and around the world with US $230 million in global box office receipts. Robinson was also a driving force behind Stephen Chow’s very successful Kung Fu Hustle.

Earlier in her career, Robinson partnered with Zhang Yimou on his films Raise the Red Lantern (Silver Lion, Venice 1991; Best Foreign Film, BAFTA 1992) and To Live (Grand Jury Prize, Cannes 1994; Best Foreign Film, BAFTA 1995). In 2006 at a CineAsiA ceremony honoring Barbara Robinson, Zhang Yimou said, "[Robinson] played a fundamental role in popularizing Chinese cinema worldwide." Her other Columbia Pictures Film Production credits with Zhang Yimou include: Not One Less (Golden Lion, Venice 1999) and The Road Home (Silver Bear, Berlin 2000).

In recognition of Robinson's creative, production, and team-building skills, she was presented with the Sony Corporation CEO Award for Excellence and was also given a Visionary Lifetime Achievement award at the 2006 CineAsia Expo in Beijing.

Robinson is fluent in Mandarin Chinese, and holds a Bachelor of Science degree from Bradley University.

References

1960 births
Living people
American film producers
American film studio executives
Bradley University alumni